The 1997 Rothmans Malta Grand Prix was the fourth edition of the professional invitational snooker tournament, which took place from 30 October to 2 November 1997. The tournament was played at the Jerma Palace Hotel in Marsaskala, Malta.

Ken Doherty won the title, defeating John Higgins 7–5 in the final.

Main draw

References

Malta Grand Prix
Malta Grand Prix
Grand Prix
Malta Grand Prix
Malta Grand Prix